Mulford Farm in East Hampton, Long Island, New York, is one of America's most significant, intact English colonial farmsteads.  The farmhouse was built in 1680 by High Sheriff Josiah Hobart, an important early official of the first New York Royal Province government. Samuel "Fish Hook" Mulford bought the property in 1712 after Hobart's death. He had the barn built in 1721. The property is listed as a contributing property of the East Hampton Village District, a historic district listed on the National Register of Historic Places.

The Mulford Farm site has been interpreted as the year 1790, and includes the house, barn, spinning dependency, privy, smokehouse and garden. It is owned by the East Hampton Historical Society and operated as a living museum. Next to it is a colonial house museum, called "Home Sweet Home" for its association with songwriter John Howard Payne, who spent time as a child there at what was his grandfather's house. The Pantigo windmill is located behind it.

The Mulford Farm museum is located at 10 James Lane, East Hampton, New York, accessible by Montauk Highway. It is open from Memorial Day weekend through Columbus Day weekend.

References

External links

East Hampton Historical Society: Mulford Farm

Houses on the National Register of Historic Places in New York (state)
Museums in Suffolk County, New York
East Hampton (village), New York
Living museums in New York (state)
Farm museums in New York (state)
Houses completed in 1680
National Register of Historic Places in Suffolk County, New York
1680 establishments in the Province of New York
Buildings and structures in Suffolk County, New York
Farmhouses in the United States